Nikolay Ivanovich Abramov (born 5 January 1950 in Kotelniki; died 6 August 2005 in Moscow) was a Soviet footballer.

Honours
Soviet Top League winner: 1969
Soviet Cup winner: 1971

International career
Abramov made his debut for USSR on 13 May 1972 in the UEFA Euro 1972 quarterfinal against Yugoslavia.

External links
Profile 

1950 births
2005 deaths
Soviet footballers
Soviet Union international footballers
UEFA Euro 1972 players
FC Spartak Moscow players
Soviet Top League players
Association football defenders
Sportspeople from Moscow Oblast